A blue book exam is a type of test administered at many post-secondary schools in the United States. Blue book exams typically include one or more essays or short-answer questions. Sometimes the instructor will provide students with a list of possible essay topics prior to the test itself and will then choose one or let the student choose from two or more topics that appear on the test.

History
Butler University in Indianapolis was the first to introduce exam blue books, which first appeared in the late 1920s. They were given a blue color because Butler's school colors are blue and white; therefore they were named "blue books".

See also
Examination book

References

School examinations
Butler University
1920s establishments in Indiana